John W. Brownson may refer to:
 John W. Brownson (New York politician) (1807–1860)
 John W. Brownson (Wisconsin politician) (1842–1924)